Elna Reinach was the defending champion but lost in the first round to Andrea Strnadová.

Ginger Helgeson won in the final 7–6(7–4), 6–3 against Inés Gorrochategui.

Seeds
A champion seed is indicated in bold text while text in italics indicates the round in which that seed was eliminated.

  Julie Halard (semifinals)
  Patricia Hy (semifinals)
  Ginger Helgeson (champion)
  Inés Gorrochategui (final)
  Elna Reinach (first round)
  Emanuela Zardo (second round)
  Alexandra Fusai (first round)
  Karin Kschwendt (second round)

Draw

External links
 ITF tournament edition details
 WTA tournament draws

WTA Auckland Open
1994 WTA Tour